The Snake Range is a mountain range in White Pine County, Nevada, United States. The south-central portion of the range is included within Great Basin National Park, with most of the remainder included within the Humboldt-Toiyabe National Forest. The range also contains four of the five highest mountain peaks in Nevada, including all peaks greater than  except for Boundary Peak.

Geography

To the west are Spring Valley and the Schell Creek Range, and to the east across the Utah border are Snake Valley and the Confusion Range. Sacramento Pass is where U.S. Route 6-50, the "Loneliest Highway in America", crosses the range. It is the principal means of eastbound access to this part of eastern Nevada.

Natural history
Great Basin National Park is located in the southern section of the Snake Range. Established in 1986, it protects the unique geologic and habitat features of the mountain range and Great Basin Desert, and their representations of the Central Basin and Range ecoregion. The southern section also includes the natural rock Lexington Arch ( span), and the Lehman Caves, both formed from the range's limestone.

Several large groves of ancient Great Basin Bristlecone Pine (Pinus longaeva) trees thrive in the Great Basin montane forests of the range's higher elevations.

The higher elevations of the Snake Range in the northern section are protected by the Mount Moriah Wilderness Area, and in the southern section by the Highland Ridge Wilderness.

Peaks

Southern
The Snake Range includes two groups of peaks. The southern section rises quickly from a point near the border with Lincoln County, reaching the summit of Granite Peak just  to the north.

From there northwards the range continues to rise, passing Lincoln Peak, Mt. Washington, Pyramid Peak, Baker Peak, and Doso Doyabi.

It finally reaches its apex at Wheeler Peak.

Northern
North of Wheeler Peak the range begins to drop, reaching  at Sacramento Pass, just  to the north. Sacramento Pass is where the more remote northern section of the range begins.

In just  the range rises past Silver Creek Canyon and Hendrys Creek Canyon to the summit of photogenic Mt. Moriah. A grove of ancient Great Basin Bristlecone Pines grows on this plateau near the peak.

North of "The Table" is another unusual geologic feature. Deadman Creek and Smith Creek, draining eastward into Snake Valley, combine to carve a deep canyon into the range.

References

External links

 Peakbagger.com (Snake Range)
 Summitpost.org (Mt. Moriah)

Mountain ranges of Nevada
Mountain ranges of the Great Basin
Mountain ranges of White Pine County, Nevada
Great Basin National Park